The Tales of Hoffmann (German: Hoffmanns Erzählungen) is a 1923 Austrian silent film directed by and starring Max Neufeld. The film also features Karl Ehmann, Eugen Neufeld and Robert Valberg.

Cast
 Max Neufeld as E. T. A. Hoffmann
 Kitty Hulsch as Olympia 
 Josef Zetenius as Narr 
 Karl Ehmann as Puppenhändler 
 Viktor Franz as Trödler 
 Karl Forest as Rat Crespel 
 Paul Askonas as Dr. Mirakel 
 Lola Urban-Kneidinger as Antonia 
 Eugen Neufeld as Dapertuto 
 Robert Valberg as Schlemihl
 Friedrich Feher
 Dagny Servaes
 Hans Moser

References

Bibliography
 Robert von Dassanowsky. Austrian Cinema: A History. McFarland, 2005.

External links

1923 films
Austrian silent feature films
Films directed by Max Neufeld
Films based on works by E. T. A. Hoffmann
Austrian black-and-white films
Films based on operas
Biographical films about writers
Films based on The Sandman (short story)